Fufeng Group is the largest private-owned monosodium glutamate (flavour enhancer) and the second largest xanthan gum producer in Mainland China. Its products include flavour enhancers, xanthan gum, fertilizer, starch, and sugar substitute. The company was founded in 1999 and is headquartered in Binzhou, Shandong Province, China. The company's current CEO is Li Xuechun. Fufeng Group is one of the largest MSG producers in China and has a global presence, with operations in Asia, Europe, and the Americas. The company's products are sold under the brand name "Weifang Fufeng," and it also produces other food additives such as xanthan gum, citric acid, and sodium bicarbonate. Fufeng Group is listed on the Hong Kong Stock Exchange.

History 
Fufeng was founded in 1999 and listed on the Hong Kong Stock Exchange on 8 February 2007. However, after issuing a profit warning and profit decline at the first half year in 2007 due to a rise in the price of corn, its share price dropped below the IPO price.

North Dakota plant 
In 2022, a proposed Fufeng plant in Grand Forks, North Dakota garnered opposition and legal challenges due to national security concerns. Civic groups and journalists voiced concerns about the parent company's connections with the Chinese government, the company's labor practices in Xinjiang, and the proposed plant's proximity to Grand Forks Air Force Base. Specific concern was raised about the possibility of the plant being used as a site for signals intelligence and electronic warfare against the Air Force base.

The United States-China Economic and Security Review Commission also raised concerns about the plant and the ranking members of the United States Senate Select Committee on Intelligence voiced opposition and requested a review of the transaction by the Committee on Foreign Investment in the United States (CFIUS). In September 2022, the mayor of Grand Forks paused construction of the plant.

In response, the House Appropriations Committee subsequently enacted a ban on purchases of U.S. farmland by China and certain other nations in its 2023 funding bill. In January 2023, the United States Air Force called the proposed plant a "significant threat to national security."

On February 7, 2023, officials in Grand Forks, North Dakota voted 5–0 to strike down the company's plans for a corn mill on the site. The vote allows the company to own the property but denies infrastructure and building permits at the site.

References

External links

Companies listed on the Hong Kong Stock Exchange
Food and drink companies of China
Privately held companies of China
Companies based in Jinan
Chemical companies established in 1999
Chinese companies established in 1999